The 2019 SWAC men's basketball tournament was the postseason men's basketball tournament for the Southwestern Athletic Conference during the 2018–19 season. Tournament first round games were played at the campus of the higher seeded team on March 12. The remainder of the tournament was held on March 15 and 16, 2019 at the Bill Harris Arena in Birmingham, Alabama. Prairie View A&M defeated Texas Southern 92–86 in the championship game to win the tournament, and received the SWAC's automatic bid to the 2019 NCAA tournament. It was the second SWAC title for Prairie View A&M, and the first since the 1997–98 season.

Seeds
The top eight teams qualified for the conference tournament. Teams were seeded by conference record, with a tiebreaker system used for teams with identical conference records. The top 4 seeds host their quarterfinal round games.  Alabama A&M is ineligible for postseason play due to APR violations.

Schedule and results

Bracket

First round games at campus sites of lower-numbered seeds

References

SWAC men's basketball tournament
2018–19 Southwestern Athletic Conference men's basketball season
Basketball competitions in Birmingham, Alabama
2019 in sports in Alabama
College sports tournaments in Alabama